Matteo Prati (born 28 December 2003) is an Italian professional footballer who plays as a midfielder for  club SPAL.

Club career
Prati made his senior professional debut for the club he was raised in, Ravenna in Serie C in March 2021. Following Ravenna's relegation to Serie D for the 2021–22 season, he became a regular member of the starting lineup.

On 27 July 2022, Prati signed a three-year contract (with an option to extend for one more year) with SPAL in Serie B. He made his Serie B debut for SPAL on 3 September 2022 in a game against Bari.

References

External links
 

2003 births
Living people
Italian footballers
Association football midfielders
Ravenna F.C. players
S.P.A.L. players
Serie C players
Serie D players
Serie B players